Feri Ariawan is an Indonesian footballer.

References

External links 
 
 

Indonesian footballers
1986 births
Living people
Association football forwards
Persiba Balikpapan players
Persela Lamongan players
Sportspeople from Surabaya
21st-century Indonesian people